The 2012 Georgia State Panthers football team represented Georgia State University in the 2012 NCAA Division I FCS football season. The Panthers were led by third year head coach Bill Curry and played their home games at the Georgia Dome. Georgia State was a full member of the Colonial Athletic Association (CAA), but announced on April 9, 2012 that it would return to the Sun Belt Conference, which it had left in 1981, in July 2013. In advance of this move, the Panthers began a transition to Division I FBS in 2012. As a result of these moves, the 2012 season was the first and only year that they competed in the CAA for football. Although not qualifying, they were ineligible for the FCS playoffs as a transitional FBS team.  The Panthers finished the season 1–10, 1–7 in CAA play.

Season summary
The 2012 season was the first and only season that Georgia State participated as a member of the Colonial Athletic Association. Beginning 2013, the Panthers will compete as an FBS transitional team as a part of the Sun Belt Conference.
During the August 30 season opener against South Carolina State University, sophomore punter Matt Hubbard made the equivalent of an FCS and FBS single game punting distance average record of 62.2 yards. However, due to GSU's reclassifying status, it is neither considered FBS nor FCS, and therefore the record does not count in either of those categories.
This season marked Bill Curry's final year as a college football head coach. He was replaced by Trent Miles, former Indiana State head coach.

Coaching staff

Defensive coordinator John Thompson was hired by Arkansas State in February 2012. He was replaced by Anthony Midget, the former special teams coach.

Schedule

References

Georgia State
Georgia State Panthers football seasons
Georgia State Panthers football